Geetha Gopi (born 30 May 1973) is a Communist Party of India politician from Thrissur and Member of the Kerala Legislative Assembly from Nattika Assembly Constituency. She started her Political career in the year 1995. She was the Chairperson of Guruvayur Municipality in 2004 and 2009 and deputy chairperson of the same in 2011. She was born in Punnayurkulam on 30 May 1973.

On 15 June 2017, the CPI issued a warning to Gopi for attending her daughter's lavish wedding.

References

Malayali politicians
People from Thrissur district
Living people
1973 births
Communist Party of India politicians from Kerala
Female politicians of the Communist Party of India
Kerala MLAs 2011–2016
20th-century Indian women politicians
20th-century Indian politicians
21st-century Indian women politicians
21st-century Indian politicians
People from Guruvayur
Women members of the Kerala Legislative Assembly